Daramy (surname) is a common surname among the Mandinka people of West Africa, and may refer to:

Kanji Daramy, Sierra Leonean journalist and spokesman for former Sierra Leone's president Ahmad Tejan Kabbah from 2002 to 2007 
Mabinty Daramy, Sierra Leone's deputy foreign minister
Mohamed Daramy, Danish football player for AFC Ajax
Mohamed B. Daramy, Sierra Leone minister of Trade and industry from 2002 to 2007

Surnames of African origin